Derrick Knight (3 February 1929 - 28 December 2022) was a British film director and producer.

Knight directed the 1966 film Traveling for a Living about the English folk group The Watersons.

References

External links
Derrick Knight at IMdB

British film directors
British film producers
1929 births
2022 deaths